The village of Al-Sour Bani Al-Harith is in the southeast of Taif Governorate, administratively affiliated to Maysan Governorate, Bani Al-Harith,
famous for agriculture.

See also 

 List of cities and towns in Saudi Arabia
 Regions of Saudi Arabia

References

Populated places in Mecca Province